The discography of American rock group Steve Miller Band is composed of 18 studio albums (including one solo album by Steve Miller), six live albums, eleven  compilation albums, three video albums and thirty singles.

Originally called the Steve Miller Blues Band, the group first made its mark as a psychedelic blues rock band in San Francisco. They went through a fallow period commercially in the early seventies before coming back with the hit album The Joker and the song of the same name in late 1973, followed by the band's two most successful studio albums in 1976 and 1977, Fly Like an Eagle and Book of Dreams. In 1978, they released their biggest selling album in North America, Greatest Hits 1974–78, which has been certified 13× Platinum in the United States and diamond in Canada. Although the 1981 release Circle of Love was less successful than the two preceding studio albums, the popularity of 1982's Abracadabra, which included the worldwide hit single of the same name, more than made up for it. The band's studio releases became more infrequent at this point, with the biggest gap in albums being between 1993's Wide River and 2010's Bingo!. Their most recent studio album is 2011's Let Your Hair Down.

The band's releases have been most successful in North America: two number-one albums in Canada, three number one singles in the United States, two number one singles in Canada, three multi-platinum awards in the United States, and selling over 24 million albums in the United States alone. The band's most successful singles have been "The Joker", which peaked in the top 10 of the trade charts of six countries—reaching number one in four, and "Abracadabra", which made the top 10 in five countries—and number one in two countries. Of the band's albums, 12 have reached the top 40 in the United States and seven have done the same in Canada.

Albums

Studio albums

Live albums

Compilation albums

Singles

Video albums

Notes 
A.Album credited to "The Steve Miller Band".
B.Born 2 B Blue is a Steve Miller solo album.
D.All peak positions for "The Joker", except in the United States, are from the single's 1990 reissue.
E.Credited to Steve Miller on the American single release.
F.A UK only release.

References

External links

Discographies of American artists
Rock music group discographies